San Bartolomeo is a Baroque-style, Roman Catholic church located in the neighborhood of Loggio, in the territory of the commune of Valsolda, Province of Como, region of Lombardy, Italy.

This church was founded in 1262, located between Loggio and Drano. Accessible by a set of stairs, the church was refurbished last in 1736, when the belltower was re-erected and granted a golden globe. 

On the counterfacade is a large fresco depicting the Triumph of the Eucharist, a favorite theme of the Counter-reform, by Giovanni Battista Pozzi, based on a tapestry by Rubens located in Turin.

References

18th-century Roman Catholic church buildings in Italy
Roman Catholic churches completed in 1736
Churches in the province of Como